Chaitanya or Chaithanya may refer to

Philosophy
Chaitanya (consciousness), Hindu philosophical concept

People
Chaitanya (name)
Chaitanya Mahaprabhu (1486–1533), founder of Gaudiya Vaishnavism

Media
Chaitanya (film), a 1991 Telugu film
Shri Chaitanya Mahaprabhu (film), a 1954 Hindi biopic film 
Chaitanya Mangala, a 16th-century hagiographical work 
Chaitanya Charitamrita, a biography of Chaitanya Mahaprabhu
Chaitanya Bhagavata, a hagiography of Chaitanya Mahaprabhu

Education

Sree Chaitanya Mahavidyalay, a college in India
Chaitanya Bharathi Institute of Technology in India
Chaitanya Engineering College in Visakhapatnam, India
Sree Chaitanya College in India
Sri Chaitanya Techno School, Eluru in India